Niederau is a municipality in the district of Meißen, in Saxony, Germany.

Niederau station is located on the Leipzig–Dresden railway, which also used to have Oberau Tunnel until 1933, which was located within today's municipality Niederau.

References 

 
Meissen (district)